Joseph Denis Odevaere, or Joseph-Désiré Odevaere (2 December 1775, in Bruges – 26 February 1830, in Brussels), was a Neo-Classical painter from the Southern Netherlands (now Belgium). He served as court painter to King William I.

Biography
He then moved to Paris, continuing his studies with Joseph-Benoît Suvée and Jacques-Louis David. In 1804, he was awarded the Prix de Rome for his painting The Death of Phocion. This earned him his first commissions, which he spent a year fulfilling prior to his departure.

He then spent eight years at several locations in Italy, copying the old masters and taking particular inspiration from Raphael. While there, he was one of a large group of artists chosen to provide decorations for Napoleon's visit at the Palazzo del Quirinale although, as it turned out, he never produced more than sketches. After that, he spent some time in Paris and received a Gold Medal from Napoleon. While there, he also worked with Godefroy Engelmann, one of the first lithographers in France.

An exhibition in Ghent two years later led to his appointment as court painter to King William I of the Netherlands in 1815. In this position, he began a campaign for the return of several major art works that had been looted from Bruges by the French Army; including pieces by Michelangelo, Jan van Eyck, Hans Memling, and Gerard David. In thanks for his successful efforts, the City Council of Bruges voted to award him a gold medal in 1816. He was elected a fourth class corresponding member living abroad of the Royal Institute of the Netherlands in 1816.

From 1825 to 1829, he painted several works in support of the Greek War of Independence and styled himself "Joseph Dionysius Odevaere". He also wrote some treatises on art and was a regular, highly opinionated contributor to local periodicals.

In 1818, he married Sylvie de la Rue (1796–1845). After his death, in 1835, she married , Secretary of the Provisional Government of Belgium.

He was a founding member of the first Société des douze.

References

Further reading
 H. Hyman, Joseph-Désiré Odevaere, in: Biographie nationale de Belgique, XVI, 1901, col. 68–74.
 Albert Schouteet, Kunstschilder Jozef Odevaere en de terugkeer van geroofde kunstschatten uit Frankrijk naar Brugge in 1816, in: Album archivaris Jos Desmet, Brugge, 1964.
 Denis Coekelberghs, Les peintres belges à Rome de 1700 à 1830, Academia Belgica, 1976.
 M. Guedron, Suvée, Odevaere, Kinsoen et Ducq: quatre preintres Brugeois à Paris au temps du néo-classicisme, in: Jaarboek 1995–96, Stedelijke Musea Brugge, pgs.238-254.
 Andries Van Den Abeele, Prefect Bernard-François de Chauvelin en de schilder Joseph Odevaere, in: Handelingen van het genootschap voor geschiedenis, Brugge, 2004, pgs.365-374.

External links

Entry on Odevaere from the ''Biographisch Woordenboek der Nederlanden.
Obituary @ Koninklijke Nederlandse Akademie van Wetenschappen (KNAW).
ArtNet: More works by Odevaere

1775 births
1830 deaths
19th-century Flemish painters
Belgian neoclassical painters
Artists from Bruges
Members of the Royal Netherlands Academy of Arts and Sciences
Prix de Rome for painting
Artists from the Austrian Netherlands